Muhammad Kabir Nuhu-Koko, also known as Kabiru Nuhu-Koko, or M.K. Nuhu-Koko is a Nigerian Civil Engineer, and career Civil Servant who served in the Federal Ministry of works, Lagos from 1984-1989. He later joined the Central Bank of Nigeria in 1990 and rose to the position of Deputy Director in the Procurement and Support Services Department until his retirement in 2019. Nuhu-koko was also the president general of the Unity Schools Old Students Association USOSA from 2013 until 2015.

Biography 

Nuhu-koko was born in Birnin Kebbi, Kebbi state Nigeria into the Family of late Alhaji Nuhu Balarabe Koko, a prominent educationist, and former permanent secretary at the Sokoto state ministry of Education. During his childhood, his family moved a lot due to the nature if his father's teaching job.

Primary education 
Nuhu-koko attended the Turaki primary school in Sokoto state 1972-1977

Secondary and higher education 
He enrolled into the Federal Government College, Kano in 1977 and later on proceeded to the prestigious Ahmadu Bello University, Zaria. He graduated with a B.Sc in Building Engineering in 1983, and later obtained an M.Sc in Construction Technology in 1988.

Career 
Nuhu-koko began his career as a budding Engineer while serving with the Niger River Basin Development Authority (NRBDA) Ilorin, this was part of his mandatory youth service with the NYSC 1983-1984. He went on to work with the Federal Ministry of works Lagos, as a Junior engineering staff from 1984-1989. While at the Federal Ministry of Works in Lagos, he worked on a groundbreaking experiment that formed the basis of the report 'The use of Palm kernel shells as aggregates for concrete', which he presented at the 21st Annual Conference of Materials Testing, Control, and Research in 1990. It was part of his Masters thesis, and has been widely referenced in Nigerian academia. He joined the Central Bank of Nigeria in 1990, a job that would see him move to the new capital of Nigeria, Abuja. Nuhu-koko remained at the CBN where he served for 30 years, in the course of which he handled, and supervised several construction projects for the bank. He eventually rose to the position of the Head of Projects planning, and Implementation division, procurement and support services department of the CBN. The department of the bank that handles and oversees all major contracts, procurement, tenders and construction projects. He took over this role from the current Deputy Governor Edward Adamu, who was then promoted to the position of Director, Human resources department.

In 2013, Nuhu-koko contested for the presidency of the Unity School Old Students Association (USOSA) and won. He was President General of USOSA from 2013-2015. As President General of USOSA he actively advocated for the increased funding of federal Government colleges (Unity schools) expressing his dismay about the decay of the schools, and declaring a total war on anyone who wants them abolished. He was also very passionate about providing adequate security for unity schools, especially those in the North Eastern part of Nigeria where a violent insurgency had claimed the lives of so many including students.

During his time as the Head of Projects at the CBN, Nuhu-Koko oversaw the completion of several high profile legacy projects that were part of the CBN's Intervention as part of its Corporate Social Responsibility. Some of which include;
 Center of Excellence - University of Ibadan
 Center of Excellence - University of Nigeria, Nsukka.
 Center of Excellence - Ahmadu Bello University, Zaria

On the 20th of August, 2013, while representing the Former CBN Governor Sanusi Lamido Sanusi, Nuhu-koko presented the sum of N10billion as intervention funds to the Usman Dan Fodio University, Sokoto. He described the funds as being part of the CBN's CSR aimed at building infrastructure, capacity and manpower for the university. While addressing members of the press, he said;

Awards and honors 
On the 31st of January 2016, Nuhu-Koko was Awarded the Sir Alhaji Ahmadu Bello Sardauna Platinum Leadership Award by the Northern Youth Network. He is also the recipient of Nigeria Arise Merit Award 2013 for 'Uplifting Nigerian Educational Standard'. Alhaji Nuhu-Koko also holds the royal title of 'Shettiman Koko' in his hometown of Koko.

Personal life 
He was married to late Rabi Abdu Gusau (Daughter of Alhaji Abdu Gusau) and they had 3 children together. Nuhu-Koko remarried in 1996 to Hadiza Nuhu-koko, and now has 5 Children and 4 grand Children.

See also 
 Edward Lametek Adamu
 Sanusi Lamido Sanusi

References 

Living people
1959 births
Nigerian bankers
People from Kebbi State
Ahmadu Bello University alumni
Nigerian engineers
Nigerian civil engineers
Nigerian civil servants
Hausa people